Jeciel Jair Cedeño Benavides (born 3 April 2000) is an Ecuadorian footballer who plays for Hartford Athletic in the USL Championship.

Career
Cedeño is a member of the New York Red Bulls Academy. During the 2019 USL Championship season he appeared for New York Red Bulls II.

On 27 May 2021, Cedeño signed with USL Championship side Hartford Athletic.

References

External links 
 
 ussoccerda.com profile

2000 births
Living people
Ecuadorian footballers
Ecuadorian expatriate footballers
Association football midfielders
New York Red Bulls II players
Hartford Athletic players
USL Championship players